Kenneth James Gibson (born 8 September 1961) is a Scottish politician serving as the Convenor of the Finance and Public Administration Committee since 2021. A member Scottish National Party (SNP), he has been the Member of the Scottish Parliament (MSP) for Cunninghame North since 2007, having previously represented the Glasgow electoral region from 1999 to 2003.

Career
Born in Paisley, Gibson served as an SNP councillor in Glasgow for Mosspark from 1992 to 1999, becoming the first ever party representative in the city to serve successive terms. Following the defection of three Labour councillors and a by-election win, Gibson (also known as 'Kenny') became Leader of the Opposition on Glasgow City Council from January 1998 until being replaced on the council by his mother Iris in the election of 1999.

Gibson was first elected to the Scottish Parliament at the 1999 Scottish Parliament election as a list member for Glasgow electoral region. Despite these efforts, he failed to win re-election in 2003.

In 2004, Gibson was third on the SNP's list for election to the European Parliament. In 2007, he was chosen to contest the constituency of Cunninghame North, winning that seat from Labour by the smallest margin in Scotland of 48 votes. In the subsequent 2011 SNP landslide election, Gibson secured a comfortable majority of 6,117 over Allan Wilson, the same Labour candidate, and former Scottish Minister, he had defeated by so slight a margin in 2007.

In addition to his constituency activities, Gibson was also the Convener of the Finance Committee in the Scottish Parliament from 2011 to 2016 and brought attention to enhanced financial powers in the Scotland Act 2012. Gibson is currently a member of the Culture, Tourism, Europe and External Affairs Committee and the Local Government and Communities Committee.

Gibson is also actively involved in a number of Cross-Party Groups, serving as Convener of the Cross-Party Group on Epilepsy; the Cross-Party Group on Improving Scotland's Health: 2021 and Beyond; and the Cross-Party Group on Life Sciences.

Controversies
In March 1993, when Gibson was a Councillor for Mosspark, a warrant for his arrest was issued following his failure to appear for trial in connection with an alleged offence under the Representation of the People Act.

In February 2000, The Sunday Mail reported allegations from a disabled SNP member, Gill Strachan, that Gibson had pushed and abused her during the SNP Conference in Inverness in October 1999. Strachan subsequently resigned from the SNP, accusing the party of mounting a cover-up of the incident.

In 2009, Gibson was criticised by other MSPs for writing to North Ayrshire Council in support of a planning application for 24 houses made by a friend, Billy Maclaren, while failing to disclose either the friendship or his financial relationships with Maclaren.

Gibson was identified as one of 12 Holyrood politicians employing a close family member in 2013, but declined to provide information on the salary, work hours, or whether the job had been advertised. His wife Patricia Gibson (now an MP) was employed as a policy adviser. Employing family members was declared bad practice in 2010 and outlawed in 2015.

In March 2017, Holyrood's Standards Committee admonished Gibson for failure to make an oral declaration of a registered financial interest. The Commissioner for Ethical Standards in Public Life in Scotland submitted a report to the Procurator Fiscal. However, the alleged offence was "time barred from criminal proceedings." Political opponents called for his suspension from the SNP.

The Cunninghame North Constituency Association issued "an urgent call" for members to come forward to challenge Gibson to be the SNP representative for the area in the 2021 Scottish Parliament election campaign. In October 2020, it was reported that Gibson would face a reselection challenge for the Cunninghame North Seat. On 14 October it was reported that two SNP party officials had resigned in protest, with allegations that Gibson had been 'aggressive and abrasive' bullying, 'especially of women'. The article quoted Cunninghame North Constituency Organiser Dr Malcolm Kerr as saying "the allegations against Mr Gibson include bullying, harassment and abuses of parliamentary expenses rules." Shortly after this, the SNP suspended the selection procedure in Cunninghame North in response to these allegations.

In December 2022, Gibson was said to be "bordering on hate speech" by Scottish Labour MSP Mercedes Villalba. This was during the Stage 3 debate on the Gender Recognition Reform (Scotland) Bill, where Gibson, on the topic of housing "anatomical males" in women's prisons, stated "If a fox said it was a chicken, would you put it in a henhouse? Of course not."

References

External links
Kenneth J Gibson MSP Personal Webpage
 
Kenneth Gibson SNP Member Profile

1961 births
Living people
Alumni of the University of Stirling
Politicians from Paisley, Renfrewshire
Scottish National Party MSPs
Members of the Scottish Parliament 1999–2003
Members of the Scottish Parliament 2007–2011
Members of the Scottish Parliament 2011–2016
Members of the Scottish Parliament 2016–2021
Members of the Scottish Parliament 2021–2026
Scottish National Party councillors
Councillors in Glasgow
People associated with North Ayrshire